Goomboorian is a rural locality in the Gympie Region, Queensland, Australia. In the  Goomboorian had a population of 499 people.

History 
Goomboorian Provisional School opened on 3 February 1902. On 1 January 1909 it became Goomboorian State School. It closed in 1967.

In the  Goomboorian had a population of 499 people.

References

External links 
 

Gympie Region
Localities in Queensland